Hylophorbus rufescens is a species of frog in the family Microhylidae. It is endemic to New Guinea and some nearby islands, and occurs in both West Papua (Indonesia) and Papua New Guinea. Common name red Mawatta frog has been coined for it.

Three subspecies are recognized:
 Hylophorbus rufescens rufescens Macleay, 1878
 Hylophorbus rufescens extimus Zweifel, 1972
 Hylophorbus rufescens myopicus Zweifel, 1972
However, it is a species complex that is not yet fully resolved. Because of continual uncertainties with delimitation of this species, its range cannot be determined accurately.

The Fergusson Island form, which may be distinct from H. rufescens proper, is infected by the nematode Moaciria moraveci.

It is nocturnal.

References

rufescens
Amphibians of Papua New Guinea
Amphibians of Western New Guinea
Taxa named by William John Macleay
Amphibians described in 1878
Taxonomy articles created by Polbot